The Prefecture, Milan (Italian: Palazzo della Prefettura di Milano), also known as Palazzo Diotti, is a historic neoclassical building which has been the location of the office of the Prefect of Milan since 1859. The building is situated at 31, Corso Monforte in the city.

History
The original building was constructed in the early 16th century for the Humiliati, a religious order originating in Lombardy. In 1616, after that order was suppressed by the pope, the building passed to another religious order, the Somaschi Fathers. In 1782 it was purchased by a wealthy lawyer, Giovanni Battista Diotti who spent twenty years extensively re-building it. Diotti, an amateur architect, designed much of the building helped by Giuseppe Piermarini and later Pietro Gilardoni (it).

However, financial difficulties forced Diotti to sell the building in 1803 to the short-lived Napoleonic Italian Republic, passing to Napoleon’s Kingdom of Italy when it was created in 1805.  The building was used as the Ministry of the Interior for the new kingdom. After the Napoleonic period, the building became a centre of government of the Austrian-ruled Kingdom of Lombardy–Venetia from 1815 to 1859. In 1817, further work on the facade was carried out under the direction of Gilardoni.  In 1849, it became the seat of the Austrian Lieutenant (or Governor) of Lombardy. Following Italian unification, it was chosen, in 1859, as the seat of the Prefecture of Milan in the new Kingdom of Italy, the Prefect being the representative of the national government at provincial level. Since then, it has remained as the seat of the Prefect of the former Province of Milan, and from 2015, its successor, the Metropolitan City of Milan.

Benito Mussolini resided in the Prefecture at the end of World War II,  using it, from 18 to 25 April 1945, as his government’s last headquarters prior to the Allied victory. After the war, in 1947, it was seized and occupied for a short period by communists protesting at the removal of the left-wing Prefect of Milan, Ettore Troilo. The protest failed, however.

The building was owned by the Province of Milan, and, subsequently, the Metropolitan City of Milan, but rented to the Prefecture. In 2017, it was reported that it was to be sold by the Metropolitan City for 38m euros to a real estate fund, established and owned by the Ministry of Finance, to assist Milan’s budget problems.

Description
Built in the neoclassical style, the imposing front of the Prefecture consists of two wings and a central section, which is set back. At the centre is a doric order peristyle  which supports a balcony. The facade of the ground floor is composed of finely dressed ashlar. On the first floor there are windows decorated with lintels surmounted by triangular gables, while on the second floor the windows are decorated with simple stone frames. The interior contains frescoes by Andrea Appiani and additional decorations by the theatrical designer Clemente Isacchi.

References

Bibliography

 
 

Buildings and structures in Milan
Government buildings in Italy
Neoclassical architecture in Milan